Letzte Tage – Letzte Nächte (Last Days – Last Nights in German language) is the eighth album by Popol Vuh. It was originally released in 1976 on United Artists Records. In 2005 SPV re-released the album with three bonus tracks.

Track listing 
All tracks composed by Florian Fricke except track number 1 composed by Daniel Fichelscher, and tracks 7, 8, and 9 composed by Florian Fricke and Daniel Fichelscher.

 "Der Große Krieger" – 3:10
 "Oh, wie nah ist der Weg hinab" – 4:34
 "Oh, wie weit ist der Weg hinauf" – 4:33
 "In Deine Hände" – 3:01
 "Kyrie" – 4:34
 "Haram Dei Raram Dei Haram Dei Ra" – 1:27
 "Dort ist der Weg" – 4:29
 "Letzte Tage – Letzte Nächte" – 4:20

2005 bonus tracks
"Wanderschaft – Wanderings" – 5:56 
"Gib hin" (Session Version) – 2:30 
"Haram Dei Ra" (Alternative Version) – 6:32 

"Letzte Tage – Letzte Nächte" was later updated as "When Love Is Calling You" on the 1991 album For You and Me.

Personnel 
Florian Fricke – piano
Daniel Fichelscher – guitar, percussion
Djong Yun – vocals
Renate Knaup – vocals

Guest musicians
Alois Gromer – sitar
Ted de Jong – tamboura

Credits 
Produced by Popol Vuh

References

External links

 https://web.archive.org/web/20081029050641/http://www.furious.com/perfect/populvuh.html (Comprehensive article & review of every album, in English)
 Enricobassi.it (featuring the original credits)
 http://www.venco.com.pl/~acrux/letzte.htm

Popol Vuh (band) albums
1976 albums
German-language albums
United Artists Records albums